Weldon Springs may refer to:

Weldon Springs (Missouri), a spring in Missouri
Weldon Springs State Recreation Area, a protected area in Illinois

See also
Weldon Spring, Missouri